The 2016 Presidential Tour of Turkey was a road cycling stage race that took place in Turkey between 24 April and 1 May 2016. It was the 52nd edition of the Presidential Tour of Turkey and was rated as a 2.HC event as part of the 2016 UCI Europe Tour. The race included eight stages; seven of these were moderately hilly, while Stage 6 ended with a summit finish at Elmalı. The defending champion was 's Kristijan Đurasek.

Schedule

Participating teams
Fifteen (15) team participated in the 2016 edition of the Presidential Tour of Turkey.

Classification leadership

Final standings

General classification

Mountains classification

Turkish Beauties classification

Points classification

Team classification

References

External links
 

Presidential Tour of Turkey
Presidential Tour of Turkey
Presidential Cycling Tour of Turkey by year